A Rush of Blood to the Head is the second studio album by British rock band Coldplay. It was released on 26 August 2002 by Parlophone in the United Kingdom, and a day later by Capitol Records in the United States. Recording started after the band became popular worldwide with the release of their debut album Parachutes (2000), and one of its singles in particular, "Yellow". The album was produced by the band and Ken Nelson, and makes greater use of the electric guitar and piano than its predecessor. The album topped the UK Albums Chart upon its first week of release in the United Kingdom, and became the eighth biggest-selling album of the 21st century in the UK. The British Phonographic Industry has since certified the album 10× Platinum for its accumulated sales of over 3 million units in the UK, while over 17 million copies were sold worldwide. The album spawned the hit singles "In My Place", "The Scientist", and "Clocks". "God Put a Smile upon Your Face" was also released, but was significantly less successful.

A Rush of Blood to the Head has been critically acclaimed, and the band received three Grammy Awards for the album; the 2003 Grammy for Best Alternative Album, which was the band's second win in a row, the 2003 Grammy for Best Rock Performance with the song "In My Place", and the 2004 Grammy for Record of the Year with the song "Clocks". In 2020, it was ranked number 324 on Rolling Stones "500 Greatest Albums of All Time". It was also among ten albums nominated for the best British album of the previous 30 years by the Brit Awards in 2010, ultimately losing to (What's the Story) Morning Glory? by Oasis. The same year, it was one of ten classic album covers from British artists commemorated on a UK postage stamp issued by the Royal Mail. Authors and reviewers have praised A Rush of Blood to the Head as one of the best albums of the 21st century.

Recording
Coldplay started recording A Rush of Blood to the Head in London on 17 September 2001, but later relocated to Liverpool, where they had recorded some of the songs on their debut album Parachutes (2000). Lead singer Chris Martin said that once there they "became obsessed with recording". "In My Place" was the first song recorded for the album and the one that the band released as the album's lead single because it was the song that made them want to do a second album. It kept them going and made them think they could still write songs, following a strange period of not really knowing what they were doing three months after the success of Parachutes.

The opening track "Politik" was recorded two days following the September 11 attacks in 2001. According to an interview with lead singer Chris Martin, "I wrote the song on 9/11 and we recorded it on 9/13. We were all, like everyone else, I suppose, a little confused and frightened. I get off tour and had a rest for one or two days. But then I get antsy again. I want to write songs and do things, 'cause you never know what might happen." The band wrote more than twenty songs in the months following for the album and some of those, including "In My Place" and "Animals", were performed live during the tours promoting Parachutes. The album's title was revealed through a post on the band's official website.

During initial recording sessions in Liverpool, Martin and guitarist Jonny Buckland worked alone, and only on weekends. Each Monday, they would present the song ideas that they had developed to their bandmates. With A Rush of Blood to the Head nearly completed, Martin went into the studio late one night and wrote a piano riff that he has stated "just came out". The band recognised that this early version of the song, that would become "Clocks", was special the first time Martin played it to them. Reasoning that it was too late to include the song on the album, they recorded a demo version and included it on a CD marked "Songs for #3", featuring unfinished tracks they intended to work on for their third studio album.

By June 2002, the band had completed A Rush of Blood to the Head, but thought their output sounded "rubbish" and reached an agreement with the label to postpone the release of the album until they were completely satisfied. Subsequently, many songs were discarded because they sounded like they could have been on Parachutes. Martin has claimed that it would have been uninteresting: "It would have shown that we're happy to sit back on what we'd done, and we're not. For us, it was important to progress and try to improve upon our abilities as musicians." Such ambitions put the band under strain: "sometimes practice sessions ended abruptly with one or more members of Coldplay threatening to quit".

After headlining the 2002 Glastonbury Festival, Coldplay returned to the studio and worked on some tracks from the "Songs for #3" CD they had produced earlier. Phil Harvey, the band's manager, heard "Clocks" and urged them to rework it immediately: "No, you must do that song now 'cause you're going on [in the lyrics] about urgency, and you're talking about keeping this song back. That doesn't make sense."

Composition 

Production of the album began quickly with the writing of the track "Politik", which was a song seen as a reflection of the world at the time, giving the band a renewed perspective on their lives and society. Many of the song lyrics on the album relate strongly to the theme of urgency. Martin has commented that previous songs were more relaxed since they were in a comfortable state of mind: "Perhaps there's a bit more urgency on some of these songs. And that's born from all the places we've been and the things we've experienced." Martin has explained. In relation to the theme of urgency, Martin has also stated that the album's title means "doing something on impulse".

Several songs on the album are about the themes of love and relationships. These tracks are based on reality, but according to Martin, they were written with a fictional twist: "Songs are like fairy tales: they have a beginning and an end and you can make it all work perfectly. Real life doesn't work like that".

The album includes ballads and acoustic songs featuring extensive use of guitar and piano. The U2-esque "epic rock" of the album's opening track "Politik", the piano-driven "Clocks", the loud guitars of "A Whisper", and the country rock-inspired guitar in "Warning Sign" were seen as an extension of the band's musical range. Chris Martin has also stated that the album's title track is an homage to American singer-songwriter Johnny Cash, whom he considered one of "the greatest ... men with just guitars". The title track is about uncertainties faced in life.

According to Martin, the song "Green Eyes" was composed for two individuals: An "American friend" (speculated to be a woman of Chris' romantic desire), and bandmate Jonny Buckland.

Artwork
The album cover for A Rush of Blood to the Head was designed by photographer Sølve Sundsbø. Sundsbø had been hired by fashion magazine Dazed & Confused in the late 1990s to produce a shot with a "technological feel, something all white", according to himself. As an artist, Sundsbø attempted to do a unique original piece, creating a shot that had never been seen before; He suggested taking shots using a three-dimensional scanning machine – used to measure head sizes for USAF fighter jet helmets – to fulfil his vision.

The model for the shots, named Mim, wore all-white cosmetic makeup, along with a coloured twill cape, to aesthetically produce optimal and desired results. The scanner could not properly identify some of the colors on the cape, so they were replaced with digital spikes, and the head in the image was chopped as the machine was unable to scan more than about thirty centimeters in height at a time. At first, Sundsbø had mixed feelings about the image, stating that when he first saw the result, he was terrified. "I thought it was so beautiful, but I was sure the magazine was never going to run it." The editor of the magazine, however, absolutely loved the image, and eventually featured it in one of their publications. After seeing the image in a publication of the magazine, Chris Martin approached Sundsbø for proper permission to use the image as the cover of A Rush of Blood to the Head. For the album's singles, Martin asked Sundsbø for any ideas; Sundsbø suggested scanning the head of each member of the band.

The album booklet contains only two photos; One with Coldplay in a location that was rumoured to be a forest, and one with the band in a recording studio. The album cover was among the ten chosen by the Royal Mail for a set of "Classic Album Cover" postage stamps issued in January 2010.

Release
A Rush of Blood to the Head was released on 26 August 2002 by Parlophone in the United Kingdom, and a day later 27 August 2002 by Capitol Records in the United States. The album was completed and originally ready to hand over to the record company and released in June 2002, however, after recording a demo of "Clocks" intended for the third album, the band delayed release by two months to allow them to work it into a finished track and include it on A Rush of Blood to the Head. Capitol released a remastered version of the album in 2008 on a 180-gram vinyl record as part of its "From the Capitol Vaults" series.

Critical reception

Upon release, A Rush of Blood to the Head received positive reviews from contemporary critics. Review aggregating website Metacritic reports a normalised score of 80 out of 100 based on 25 reviews, indicating "generally favorable reviews". This makes A Rush of Blood to the Head Coldplay's highest-scoring album on the website as of 2023. Many reviewers felt that it built upon Parachutes. Alexis Petridis of the newspaper The Guardian wrote that the band's "new assurance is everywhere ... the timidity of Parachutes is nowhere to be found". He concludes, "It sounds like an album ready to take on the world, and win."

Kelefa Sanneh of The New York Times praised the album, commenting that it is "one of the year's best albums" and describing it as "sparser, stranger and even catchier than its predecessor". Rolling Stones Rob Sheffield said that "A Rush of Blood to the Head is a nervier, edgier, thoroughly surprising album", adding, "where Parachutes was the clumsy diary of a high-strung kid, A Rush of Blood sounds more like a band with the confidence to test its own limits." Ted Kessler of NME lauded the album, calling it "an album of outstanding natural beauty, an organic, wholesome work." MacKenzie Wilson of AllMusic echoed the above comments, saying that it is a "strong album". Wilson, who compliments Martin for his "sharpened" falsetto and refined "haunting delivery" and Buckland for his "riveting guitar work", notes that "regardless of the band still being in their mid-twenties, they've made an amazing record". Emma Pearse of the American newspaper The Village Voice has the same sentiments, stating that it is "a little edgier, trancier, and more conversational" compared to Parachutes. Conversely, Robert Christgau gave the album a one-star honorable mention and quipped "Let Green Eyes dump him for real and we'll see how long he hums in the void."

In 2012, it was ranked number 466 on Rolling Stones list of the 500 greatest albums of all time, with its ranking climbing to number 324 in the 2020 update. In 2013, the album topped a BBC Radio poll ahead of Hopes and Fears by Keane, Rio by Duran Duran and The Dark Side of the Moon by Pink Floyd. It was also included in 1001 Albums You Must Hear Before You Die.

Rankings

Accolades

Commercial performance 
A Rush of Blood to the Head topped the charts of 11 countries around the world. It debuted at number-one on the UK Albums Chart selling 273,924 copies. The British Phonographic Industry has since certified the album 10× Platinum for accumulated sales of over 3 million copies. With the subsequent release of "Clocks" and "The Scientist", the album spent over one year on the chart. A Rush of Blood to the Head has been placed at number seven on the list of United Kingdom's 20 biggest-selling albums of the 21st century, published by the British trade paper Music Week. In July 2011, A Rush of Blood to the Head climbed from No. 176 back to No. 44 in the album's 250th charting week there. As of October 2018, the album has sold over 2,960,000 copies in the UK, making it Coldplay's best-selling studio album. It is the tenth best-selling album of the 21st century.

In the United States, A Rush of Blood was Coldplay's first venture into the top 5 with 144,000 copies sold initially, stronger than its predecessor, Parachutes, which debuted at number 189 in December 2000. A Rush of Blood debuted at number-one on the Canadian Albums Chart, selling 28,200 copies in its first week. The album has been certified 4x times platinum by the Canadian Recording Industry Association for shipments of over 400,000. It has been certified 7× platinum by the Australian Recording Industry Association, having accumulated shipments of over 490,000 units.

Track listing
All tracks written and co-produced by Coldplay (Guy Berryman, Jonny Buckland, Will Champion, and Chris Martin). All tracks produced by Ken Nelson.

Personnel

Credits adapted from AllMusic.

 Chris Martin – lead vocals, piano, acoustic guitar, rhythm guitar (tracks 8–9)
 Jonny Buckland – lead electric guitar, backing vocals (tracks 1 and 6), acoustic guitar (track 4), twelve-string slide guitar (track 6)
 Guy Berryman – bass guitar
 Will Champion – drums, percussion, backing vocals

Technical and additional personnel
 Coldplay – producer, string arranger, mixer, art direction
 Andrea Wright – assistant engineer
 Ann Lines – string performer
 Audrey Riley – string arranger and performer
 Ben Thackeray – assistant engineer
 Blue Source – art direction
 Chris Tombling – string performer
 Dan Green – string performer
 Dan Keeling – century, published by the British trade paper Music Week. A&R
 Danton Supple – mixer (track 2, 3, 6, 8, 10)
 Dave Holmes – manager
 Estelle Wilkinson – manager
 George Marino – mastering
 Jon Bailey – assistant engineer
 Jon Withnal – assistant engineer
 Ken Nelson – producer, engineer, mixer
 Laura Melhewish – string performer
 Leo Payne – string performer
 Mark Phythian – additional production, mixer
 Nettwerk – management
 Peter Lale – string performer
 Richard George – string performer
 Rik Simpson – additional engineering
 Sølve Sundsbø – cover art
 Susan Dench – string performer
 Tom Sheehan – photographer
 Zed Nelson – photographer

Charts

Weekly charts

Year-end charts

Decade-end charts

All-time charts

Certifications

Notes

References

Further reading

External links
 
 

2002 albums
Coldplay albums
Albums produced by Ken Nelson (British record producer)
Capitol Records albums
Parlophone albums
Grammy Award for Best Alternative Music Album
Brit Award for British Album of the Year